Jan Józef Borysewicz (born April 17, 1955) is the co-founder and guitar player of Lady Pank, a Polish rock band. He composed all but two of their songs.

Borysewicz was born in Wrocław. In the 1970s, he played for Izabela Trojanowska and Budka Suflera. Borysewicz formed Lady Pank in the spring of 1982.

Discography

Studio albums

Collaborative albums

References

1955 births
Living people
Musicians from Wrocław
Polish musicians